Metomidate is a non-barbiturate imidazole that was discovered by Janssen Pharmaceutica in 1965 and under the names (Hypnodil, Nokemyl) is sold as a sedative-hypnotic drug used in Europe to treat humans and for veterinary purposes.

11C-labelled metomidate (11C-metomidate), may be used with positron emission tomography (PET). For instance, to detect tumors of adrenocortical origin.

See also 
 Etomidate
 Propoxate

References 

11β-Hydroxylase inhibitors
Sedatives
Hypnotics
General anesthetics
Ethyl esters
Imidazoles
GABAA receptor positive allosteric modulators